The water polo tournament at the 2012 Summer Olympics in London, United Kingdom was held at the London 2012 Water Polo Arena in the Olympic Park from 29 July to 12 August. The venue's capacity held 5,000 spectators. Twelve teams competed in the men's tournament and eight teams in the women's tournament.

Qualification 

Both of Great Britain's teams automatically qualified, while the African qualification tournament was cancelled due as no teams entered, increasing the available spots at each final qualification tournament to four.

Men

Women

Draw 
The draw for the Olympic tournament took place in May 2012. The men were drawn into two groups of six teams, the women were drawn into two groups of four teams.

Men's competition

Women's competition

Medal summary

Medal table

Events

References

Sources
 PDF documents on the FINA website:
 Official Results Book – 2012 Olympic Games – Diving, Swimming, Synchronised Swimming, Water Polo (archive) (pp. 284–507)
 Water polo on the Olympedia website
 Water polo at the 2012 Summer Olympics (men's tournament, women's tournament)
 Water polo on the Sports Reference website
 Water polo at the 2012 Summer Games (men's tournament, women's tournament) (archived)

External links 

 
 
 

 
2012
2012 Summer Olympics events
Water sports in London
Olympic
2012